Getz Au Go Go is a live album by American saxophonist Stan Getz and his quartet, featuring bossa nova singer Astrud Gilberto. It was recorded during two concerts in 1964 and released on Verve the same year as V6-8600.

Track listing
"Corcovado" (Antônio Carlos Jobim) – 2:51
"It Might as Well Be Spring" (Richard Rodgers, Oscar Hammerstein II) – 4:27
"Eu e Voce" (Carlos Lyra, Vinicius de Moraes) – 2:32
"Summertime" (George Gershwin, Ira Gershwin) – 8:11
"6-Nix-Pix-Flix" (Gary Burton) – 1:05
"Only Trust Your Heart" (Benny Carter, Sammy Cahn) – 4:41
"The Singing Song" (Gary Burton) – 3:46
"The Telephone Song" (Roberto Menescal, Ronaldo Bôscoli, Norman Gimbel) – 1:57
"One Note Samba" (Jobim, Newton Mendonca) – 3:19
"Here's That Rainy Day" (Jimmy Van Heusen, Johnny Burke) – 6:15

Tracks 4–7, 9–10 recorded on May 22, 1964; tracks 1–3 and 8 on October 9, 1964.

Personnel
Stan Getz – tenor saxophone
Astrud Gilberto – vocals - except 4, 5, 7 and 10
Kenny Burrell – background guitar (#1–3, 8 only)
Gene Cherico (#1–3, 5–8), Chuck Israels (#4, 9, 10) – bass
Gary Burton – vibes
Joe Hunt (#4–7, 9–10), Helcio Milito (#1–3, 8) – drums

References 

Verve Records albums
Stan Getz live albums
1964 albums
Albums produced by Creed Taylor